List of Members of the 5th Lok Sabha, ( 15 March 1971 — 18 January 1977) elected February–March 1971.The term of the House was extended two times by one year at a time. However, the House was dissolved after having been in existence for a period of five years, 10 months, and six days. The Lok Sabha (House of the People) is the lower house in the Parliament of India. 4 sitting members from Rajya Sabha were elected to 5th Lok Sabha after the 1971 Indian general election.

Indira Gandhi was the Prime Minister as in the previous 4th Lok Sabha. However, INC lost 217 seats in the next 6th Lok Sabha, which was constituted after the 1977 Indian general election.

Important members 
 Speaker:
Gurdial Singh Dhillon from 22 March 1971 to 1 December 1975
Bali Ram Bhagat from 5 January 1976 to 25 March 1977
 Deputy Speaker:
G.G.Swell from 27 March 1971 to 18 January 1977
Secretary General:
S. L. Shakdhar from 2 September 1964 to 18 June 1977

List of members by political party

Members by political party in 5th Lok Sabha are given below-

References

External links

 5th Lok Sabha Members Official listings
 Lok Sabha website

 Terms of the Lok Sabha
India MPs 1971–1977
1971 establishments in India
1977 disestablishments in India